Polynoncus haafi is a species of hide beetle in the subfamily Omorginae found in Argentina.

References

haafi
Beetles described in 1962